Alex Burtzos (born 1985 in Denver, Colorado, United States) is an American composer based in New York City and Orlando, Florida.

Life and career
Alex Burtzos was born in Denver, Colorado, and grew up in nearby Colorado Springs. He studied music at Loyola University New Orleans before moving to New York City in 2010, where he earned his doctorate in composition from Manhattan School of Music in 2016. His primary teachers include James Paton Walsh, J. Mark Stambaugh, and Reiko Fueting. Burtzos' music has been performed across four continents, and has received awards from numerous organizations within the United States. He has received particular attention for his compositions for authentic baroque-era instruments. Other of Burtzos' compositions utilize rappers, metal guitar, and other sounds drawn from popular music.

Burtzos is the founder of ICEBERG New Music, a composers collective based in New York City. In 2018, he was named Assistant Professor of Composition at The University of Central Florida.

Compositions

Solo
 Football in Marja (2011) for Piano Solo
 He Never Heard That Fleshless Chant (2011) for Solo Oboe
 Wilfred Owen at the Gates (2015) for Piano Solo
 Should the Wide World Roll Away (2018) for Piano Solo
 Perforation (2018) for Piano Solo

Chamber
 R A G E . (2018) for ensemble
 pOwer trIo (2018) for saxophone, piano, percussion
 The Birth of Dangun (2018) for piano trio
 we ain't got no $$$ honey but DAMN we got _ (2017) for percussion quartet
 Megalopolis (2017) for saxophone ensemble
 The Hourglass Equation (2017) for flute, violin, bassoon, and harpsichord
 The F Word (2016) for amplified ensemble with MC
 SONATA/SONARE (2016) for trio sonata
 The Rembrandt of Avenue A (2015) for amplified ensemble with MC
 X Codes (2015) for violin, clarinet, and piano
 Alice and Zoltan 4ever (2014) for saxophone, bass trombone, and piano
 One Final Gyre (2014) for two saxophones
 OMAHA (all the things you could be you are you were) (2014) for string quartet
 The Impossible Object (2014) for violin and piano
 SXTG >;-) (2013) for clarinet, cello, and guitar
 Teach the Torches to Burn Bright (2013) for violin, clarinet, and piano
 12.14.12 (2013) for ensembles
 Prince Prospero (2013) for soprano, flute, oboe, saxophone, guitar, piano, and percussion
 A Country of Vast Designs (2012) for string quartet
 The Revivalist (2012) for saxophone quartet
 March the Twenty-Fifth (2011) for woodwind quartet
 The Outlaw in the Gilded Age (2010) for violin, clarinet, saxophone, horn and piano

Choral and vocal
 Many Worlds I (2016) for baritone, trumpet, bass clarinet, and trombone
 The Explosion, and Other Tales (2016) for mezzo-soprano and piano
 Gursky Songs (2015) for baritone and piano trio
 Love and Loss and Loathing and Lizards (2015) for soprano, MC, and amplified ensemble
 Come Away Death (2012) for Countertenor and Harp with SATB Chorus
 The Hill Wife (2012) for mezzo-soprano with ensemble
 Days Into Days (2011) for soprano with large ensemble

Electronic and mixed media
 LEGION (2017) for flute, piano, and electronics
 When He First Appears (2017) for soprano, viola, harp, and electronics
 MASKS (2016) for baritone, guitar, piano, and electronics
 In a Cool, Green Hall (2010) for Fixed Media

Large ensemble
 The Black Riders (2013) for Orchestra
 Sky Above Clouds (2011) for Orchestra
 In Search of a Bird (2011) for Chamber Orchestra
 The Conqueror (2009) for Wind Ensemble
 Psyche (2009) for Wind Ensemble
 Colorado (2008) for Wind Ensemble
 Colorado (2007) for Orchestra

References

Living people
1985 births
21st-century American composers